Dunkirk High School (DHS) is a public high school located in Dunkirk, New York. It is situated on 6th Street, a few blocks from the city downtown. The High School currently enrolls 756 students in grades 7 through 12.

School overview

Dunkirk High School serves as the only public High School in the city. The school enrolls 603 students in grades 9 through 12. The ethnic break-down is as follow: White 51%, Hispanic 40%, Black 9% and Asian 1%. The faculty is composed by 60 classroom teachers. The graduation rate is 71%.

Sports activities

Bowling
Basketball
Wrestling
Cross Country
Golf
Indoor Track
Outdoor Track
Soccer
Swimming
Tennis
Cheerleading
Softball
Volleyball
Football
Baseball

References 

Public high schools in New York (state)
Schools in Chautauqua County, New York